Isla Mocha Airport  is an airport on the east side of Isla Mocha, a small Pacific island  off the coast of Chile. Isla Mocha is part of Chile's Bío Bío Region.

The airport lies along the shore, and approach and departures are over the water.

There are no published radio navaids on the island.

See also

Transport in Chile
List of airports in Chile

References

External links
OpenStreetMap - Isla Mocha
Isla Mocha OurAirports
FallingRain - Isla Mocha Airport

Airports in La Araucanía Region